Myennis sibirica is a species of ulidiid or picture-winged fly in the genus Myennis of the family Ulidiidae.

Distribution
Russian Far East.

References

Ulidiidae
Insects described in 1891
Taxa named by Josef Aloizievitsch Portschinsky
Diptera of Asia
Endemic fauna of Tajikistan